Castillo de Garcimuñoz is a municipality in Cuenca, Castile-La Mancha, Spain. It has a population of 163.

References 

Municipalities in the Province of Cuenca